Sukenick is a surname. Notable people with the surname include:

Lynn Sukenick (1938–1995), American poet
Ronald Sukenick (1932–2004), American writer and literary theorist